We Believe may refer to:

We Believe (album), live album by Brian & Jenn Johnson
We Believe (commercial)", a television commercial by Gillette
"We Believe" (Newsboys song), a Christian song by the Newsboys, 2013
"We Believe", a song by Good Charlotte from their 2004 album The Chronicles of Life and Death
"We Believe", a song by Ministry from their 1986 album Twitch
"We Believe", a song by Red Hot Chili Peppers from their 2006 album Stadium Arcadium
"We Believe", a song by Queen + Paul Rodgers from their 2008 album The Cosmos Rocks
 We Believe, slogan for the 2006–07 Golden State Warriors season
We Believe (yard sign), originally Kindness is Everything

See also
"Because We Believe (Ama Credi E Vai)", a song by Italian pop tenor Andrea Bocelli
Still, We Believe: The Boston Red Sox Movie, 2004 documentary film documenting the Boston Red Sox' 2003 season and the team's relationship with its fans directed by Paul Doyle, Jr. 
We Believe: Chicago and Its Cubs, 2009 documentary film about Chicago and the Chicago Cubs directed by John Scheinfeld 
"We Believe in Happy Endings", song written by Bob McDill and recorded by American country music artist Johnny Rodriguez
Believe (disambiguation)